Calathus marcellae is a species of ground beetle from the Platyninae subfamily that is endemic to the Canary Islands.

References

marcellae
Beetles described in 1943
Endemic beetles of the Canary Islands